The abbreviation CWU may refer to:

Central Washington University
China Women's University
Church Women United
One of several Communication Workers' Unions, including:
Communication Workers Union of Australia
Communication Workers Union (Ireland)
Communication Workers Union (South Africa)
Communication Workers Union (Trinidad and Tobago)
Communication Workers Union (United Kingdom)
Crowhurst railway station, East Sussex, National Rail station code
 Cold Weather Uniform